Knight's Armament Company (KAC) is an American firearms and firearms parts manufacturer, best known for producing the Rail Interface System (RIS) and the Rail Adapter System (RAS) grips for firearms use. They currently produce a variety of firearms, specifically AR-15 rifles. One of their best known rifles is the SR-25 semi-automatic designated marksman rifle.

KAC is owned by C. Reed Knight and is based in Titusville, Florida. Knight's Manufacturing Company (KMC) is the division of KAC responsible for products aimed at the civilian market.

History

The United States military, as well as special forces and police around the world use KAC RIS/RAS conversions for many popular firearms, including the American M16/M4 rifles and the popular Heckler & Koch MP5 series submachine guns. The RIS/RAS system allows for the mounting of accessories to firearms without additional tools or modifications, and is used, alongside a KAC suppressor and forward grip on the "Special Operations Peculiar MODification" (SOPMOD) M4 carbine package in use by United States Special Operations Command (USSOCOM). These can include tactical flashlights, laser targeting units, bipods, and vertical foregrips.

In addition, KAC produces sound suppressors for the Heckler & Koch Mark 23 SOCOM pistol. KAC also produces a line of clip-on night vision and thermal weapon sights, including the AN/PVS-22 Universal Night Sight. KAC produces mounts for optics and grenade launchers, as well as backup iron sights.

Knight's Armament produces a line of firearms including the semi-automatic SR-15 line of rifles, the fully automatic SR-16 carbine, the semi-automatic SR-25 sniper rifle, the SR-25 based Mark 11 Mod 0 Sniper Weapon System and the M110 Semi-Automatic Sniper System. KAC also produces the Stoner LMG in limited quantities. As their apparently most original design, KAC is producing the Knight's Armament Company PDW. In 2011, KAC has released the SR15/SR16 E3 line of rifles.

References

External links

 

Companies based in Brevard County, Florida
Firearm manufacturers of the United States
Titusville, Florida
1982 establishments in Florida
Manufacturing companies based in Florida
Manufacturing companies established in 1982